Powellsville is a town in Bertie County, North Carolina, United States. The population was 276 at the 2010 census. The city is home to Travis Bond (NFL lineman)

Geography
Powellsville is located at  (36.224952, -76.931678).

Demographics

As of the census of 2000, there were 259 people, 122 households, and 71 families residing in the town. The population density was 717.9 people per square mile (277.8/km). There were 136 housing units at an average density of 377.0/sq mi (145.9/km). The racial makeup of the town was 50.97% White, 46.72% African American, 1.16% Native American, 0.39% from other races, and 0.77% from two or more races. Hispanic or Latino of any race were 0.77% of the population.

There were 122 households, out of which 17.2% had children under the age of 18 living with them, 42.6% were married couples living together, 12.3% had a female householder with no husband present, and 41.0% were non-families. 36.9% of all households were made up of individuals, and 16.4% had someone living alone who was 65 years of age or older. The average household size was 2.12 and the average family size was 2.69.

In the town, the population was spread out, with 19.7% under the age of 18, 6.9% from 18 to 24, 21.6% from 25 to 44, 30.1% from 45 to 64, and 21.6% who were 65 years of age or older. The median age was 46 years. For every 100 females, there were 91.9 males. For every 100 females age 18 and over, there were 82.5 males.

The median income for a household in the town was $18,250, and the median income for a family was $30,938. Males had a median income of $33,750 versus $15,179 for females. The per capita income for the town was $14,065. About 27.5% of families and 24.3% of the population were below the poverty line, including 32.7% of those under the age of eighteen and 33.3% of those 65 or over.

References

Towns in Bertie County, North Carolina
Towns in North Carolina